Lois Forsell (born 26 July 1991) is a retired English international rugby league footballer who played as a  for Leeds Rhinos Women in the Women's Super League. Forsell has also played for Bradford Bulls Women and Hunslet at club level, and has also represented Yorkshire.

Playing career
Forsell joined Hunslet Ladies (then known as Middleton) before moving to Bradford Bulls in 2012.  In 2017 Forsell was a member of the Bradford Bulls team that completed the treble - winning the Grand Final, League Leaders Shield and Challenge Cup in the same season - and went unbeaten all season. Forsell was named Player of the Match in the inaugural Grand Final.

At the end of the 2017 season Forsell was signed for the newly formed Leeds Rhinos Women's team and was named captain of the team for 2018.  In her first season charge she led Leeds to victory in the Challenge Cup and top of the league to win the League Leader's Shield but the treble eluded them as they lost the Grand Final to Wigan Warriors - a game Forsell missed through injury.  Forsell was nominated for the Woman of Steel award in 2018 but lost out to Castleford Tiger Georgia Roche.

In September 2018 Forsell suffered an anterior cruciate ligament injury which required surgery.  Recovery from the surgery prevented her from playing during the 2019 season and a check up towards the end of the season revealed that further surgery would be needed with no guarantee that it would enable Forsell to play again.  Forsell therefore decided to retire from playing.
 
Forsell is a development officer for the Leeds Rhinos Foundation and is the RFL's first women's player ambassador.

International career
Forsell made her debut for the England team in 2009 and was sent off in her first test match.  Subsequently she played in two World Cups (2013 and 2017 Women's Rugby League World Cup and was vice-captain for the 2017 tournament.

Coaching career
In February 2020 Forsell was named as the new head coach of the Rhinos women's team replacing Adam Cuthbertson.

Media career
Following her retirement Forsell was announced as one of the presenters of the Sky Sports rugby league show Inside Super League.

References

1991 births
Living people
England women's national rugby league team players
English female rugby league players
Leeds Rhinos Women players
Rugby league hookers
Rugby league players from Leeds